There are five business routes of Interstate 8 (I-8).

The portions of the I-8 business routes through California are mostly unsigned. All interstate business routes in California are assigned by the California Department of Transportation (Caltrans), but are not maintained by Caltrans unless they overlay other routes of the state highway system. Local authorities may request route assignment from the Caltrans Transportation System Information Program, and all requests require approval of the executive committee of the American Association of State Highway and Transportation Officials (AASHTO).

El Cajon loop

Business Loop 8 (I-8 Bus.) begins as El Cajon Boulevard at an interchange with I-8, loosely paralleling the freeway on the northern side. The loop passes through Bostonia and Lakeview before ending at the Lake Jennings Park Road interchange with I-8.

Major intersections

Alpine loop

Business Loop 8 (I-8 Bus.) in Alpine spanned from I-8 exit 30 to exit 33 and was mostly former US 80 along Alpine Drive.

El Centro loop

Business Loop Interstate 8 (I-8 Bus.) is a business loop route that diverges from I-8 in El Centro, California, to pass through the downtown area. I-8 Bus. originates and terminates with I-8 and acts as a direct link to El Centro as I-8 bypasses the downtown area.

The I-8 Bus. path through El Centro traces roughly three sides of a rectangle with I-8 constituting the fourth side. I-8 Bus. begins at its western terminus with I-8 by going north along Imperial Avenue. When I-8 Bus. reaches the intersection of Adams Avenue it turns east along that road. Along this stretch, I-8 Bus. is joined by State Route 86 (SR 86) which approaches from the north along Imperial Avenue, and by Imperial County Route S80 which approaches from the west along Adams Avenue. The three routes continue joined as Adams Avenue ends and turns south along Fourth Avenue where S80 then turns to continue east. I-8 Bus. and SR 86 continue south running concurrent until I-8 Bus. reaches its eastern terminus with I-8.

Only the portion of I-8 Bus. that runs concurrently with SR 86 is maintained by the state. Along its concurrency with SR 86, I-8 Bus. is designated as part of the Juan Bautista de Anza National Historic Trail.

Major intersections

Winterhaven–Yuma loop

Business Loop 8 (I-8 Bus. or I-8 BL) begins at an interchange with I-8 and Winterhaven Drive in Winterhaven, California. The loop continues east, paralleling I-8 to the north and running concurrently with CR S24. I-8 Bus. then goes through downtown Winterhaven before CR S24 continues east and I-8 Bus. continues south, crossing I-8 again as well as the Colorado River into Yuma, Arizona. Passing to the west of Yuma Quartermaster Depot State Historic Park, I-8 BL goes through downtown Yuma as Fourth Avenue, intersecting US 95 after several blocks. The business loop curves to the east as 32nd Street, passing along the north side of Yuma International Airport and the south side of the Yuma Conservation Garden. East of the airport, I-8 BL passes through less-developed areas of eastern Yuma before ending at I-8.

It is one of very few Interstate business loops that is interstate in the sense of crossing a state line. The Arizona segment of the business loop is also a section of Historic US 80.

Major intersections

Gila Bend loop

State Business Route 8 (3) (also known as SR 8 Bus.) begins at an interchange with I-8 west of Gila Bend before passing under the freeway, continuing east and merging with SR 85 at a truck stop. As Pima Street, the two highways continue through downtown Gila Bend before I-8 BL turns south away from SR 85 as Butterfield Trail and ending at I-8 at a diamond interchange.

Major intersections

References

08
Business routes
Interstate Highways in California
Interstate Highways in Arizona